Benoît Lang (born 19 December 1983) is a Luxembourg professional football player of Cameroonian descent.

References

1983 births
Living people
Luxembourgian people of Cameroonian descent
Luxembourgian footballers
Luxembourg youth international footballers
Luxembourg international footballers
Luxembourgian expatriate footballers
Expatriate footballers in Indonesia
Expatriate footballers in Switzerland
FC Swift Hesperange players
CS Oberkorn players
CS Grevenmacher players
F91 Dudelange players
CS Fola Esch players
Persema Malang players
Association football defenders